Goodbye kiss may refer to:

 The Goodbye Kiss (album) (Chinese: 吻別; pinyin: wěnbié), a 1993 album by Jacky Cheung, and the title song
 "Goodbye Kiss", a song by Kasabian
 The Goodbye Kiss, a novel by Massimo Carlotto
 The Goodbye Kiss (film), a 2006 Italian crime film based on the novel
 The Good-Bye Kiss, a 1928 American comedy film
 Goodbye kiss, a term describing capitulation by the target of a greenmail challenge

See also
Kiss Goodbye (disambiguation)